The Moonshiners is a 1916 American short comedy film directed by Fatty Arbuckle.

Cast
 Joe Bordeaux 
 J. Herbert Frank (as Bert Frank)
 Horace Haine
 Alice Lake
 Al St. John
 Michael Eagan

See also
 Fatty Arbuckle filmography

External links

1916 films
1916 comedy films
1916 short films
Films directed by Roscoe Arbuckle
American silent short films
American black-and-white films
Films shot in Fort Lee, New Jersey
Silent American comedy films
American comedy short films
1910s American films